Jack 'Darb' Hickey (4 January 1887 – 15 May 1950) was an Australian rugby union and pioneer professional rugby league footballer and represented his country at both sports. He was one of Australia's early dual-code rugby internationals. He competed in the 1908 Summer Olympics in rugby union and was notable for scoring the first ever try for the Australian national side in a rugby league test match.

Rugby union career
Hickey toured Britain and North America with the Wallabies captained by Paddy Moran in 1908–09. He earned two Test caps against Wales and England on the tour and was a member of the Olympic gold medal-winning Wallabies at the 1908 London games. On his return to Australia he joined the fledgling code of rugby league along with 13 of his Olympic teammates.

Rugby league career
Hickey made his international league debut in the First Test in Sydney on 18 June 1910. Four of his former Wallaby teammates also debuted that day John Barnett, Bob Craig, Charles Russell and Chris McKivat - making them collectively Australia's 11th to 15th dual code internationals. This mirrored a similar occurrence two years earlier when five former Wallabies in Micky Dore, Dally Messenger, Denis Lutge, Doug McLean snr and 
John Rosewell all debuted for the Kangaroos in the first ever Test against New Zealand.

He played in both rugby league Tests of the 1910 Great Britain Lions tour of Australasia, the first ever, and scored the first ever try for Australia in a rugby league Test Match. Darb Hickey played 4 seasons with Glebe (rugby league team) and one season at Balmain Tigers during his club career.

Death
"Darb' Hickey died of cancer on 15 May 1950 at the Sacred Heart Hospice, St. Vincent's Hospital. He was aged 63 and was survived by his eight children. A well attended funeral was held for Darb, and he was buried at Rookwood Cemetery on 16 May 1950.

See also
 Rugby union at the 1908 Summer Olympics

Footnotes

References
 Whiticker, Alan (2004) Captaining the Kangaroos, New Holland, Sydney

External links
 
 
 
 

1887 births
1950 deaths
Australian rugby union players
Australia international rugby union players
Australian rugby league players
Balmain Tigers players
Glebe rugby league players
Dual-code rugby internationals
Olympic rugby union players of Australasia
Olympic gold medalists for Australasia
Rugby union players at the 1908 Summer Olympics
Australia national rugby league team players
Medalists at the 1908 Summer Olympics
Rugby league players from Sydney
Deaths from cancer in New South Wales
Rugby union players from Sydney
Rugby union centres